Ambassis miops, commonly known as the flag-tailed glassfish, is a species of fish in the family Ambassidae. It is native to eastern Australia. It is found only in a few coastal sites along the North Queensland coast. A distinguishing feature of this species is a tiny spine is situated above the rear corner of the eye.

References

miops
Freshwater fish of Australia
Fish described in 1871
Taxa named by Albert Günther